Megalobrimus is a genus of longhorn beetles of the subfamily Lamiinae, containing the following species:

 Megalobrimus annulicornis Breuning, 1959
 Megalobrimus densegranulatus Breuning, 1969
 Megalobrimus granulipennis Breuning, 1954
 Megalobrimus ingranulatus Breuning, 1936
 Megalobrimus lettowvorbecki Kriesche, 1923
 Megalobrimus parvus Breuning, 1969
 Megalobrimus scutellatus Aurivillius, 1916

References

Phrissomini